The Smart Manager is India's first management magazine, launched in 2002 and published quarterly; the magazine has since changed to a bi-monthly publishing frequency. The magazine is published by Spenta MultiMedia and was initially founded by Mumbai business people Gita Piramal, Nitin Nohria and Sumantra Ghoshal, with Piramal as the editor. The magazine has a knowledge partnership with CNBC-TV18 (the Indian venture of CNBC) and is hosted on their online platform.

References

External links
 Official website

2002 establishments in Maharashtra
Bi-monthly magazines published in India
English-language magazines published in India
Business magazines published in India
Magazines established in 2002
Mass media in Mumbai
Quarterly magazines published in India